Isaac Liu (born 26 April 1991) is a professional rugby league footballer who plays as a  and  forward for the Gold Coast Titans in the National Rugby League (NRL). He is both a Samoan and New Zealand international.

He has previously played for the Sydney Roosters in the National Rugby League and won back-to-back NRL premierships with that club in 2018 and 2019.

Background 
Liu was born in Auckland, New Zealand and is of Samoan and Niuean heritage.

He played his junior football for the Otahuhu Leopards before moving to Australia as a teen and attending Keebra Park State High School on the Gold Coast, Queensland. He is of Samoan and Niuean descent.

In 2011, Liu signed with the Sydney Roosters. He played for the Roosters' NYC team in 2011, scoring 2 tries in 19 games.

Playing career
In round 4 of the 2013 NRL season Liu made his NRL debut for the Roosters against the Parramatta Eels in a 50-0 victory at the Sydney Football Stadium.  Liu made 15 appearances for the club in his debut season including the 40-14 preliminary final victory over Newcastle but he missed out on selection in the 2013 NRL Grand Final side which defeated Manly-Warringah.
In May 2014, Liu played for Samoa in the 2014 Pacific Rugby League International. He made headlines in the match after taking a massive shot by Fijian player Korbin Sims.  Liu made 23 appearances for Easts in the 2014 NRL season as the club won the minor premiership.  Liu played in the club's preliminary final defeat by South Sydney which ended their premiership defence.
On 7 October 2014, Liu was selected in the Samoan 24 man squad for the 2014 Four Nations series.
On 2 May 2015, Liu played for Samoa in the Polynesian Cup against Tonga.  In the 2015 NRL season, Liu made 26 appearances as the Sydney Roosters won their third consecutive minor premiership.  Liu played in the club's preliminary final loss against Brisbane at Suncorp Stadium.

On 21 July 2017, Liu played his 100th First grade game against Newcastle, in this game he scored a try as the Roosters won the match 28-4 at the Sydney Football Stadium.  Liu made a total of 22 appearances for Easts in the 2017 NRL season as the club finished 2nd on the table and reached the preliminary final before suffering a shock defeat by North Queensland.
On 5 October 2017, Liu was named in New Zealand Rugby League world cup squad. Liu made 26 appearances for Easts in the 2018 NRL season as they won the minor premiership and reached the 2018 NRL Grand Final against Melbourne.  Liu played from the bench as Easts defeated Melbourne 21-6 claiming their 14th premiership.
Liu made 24 appearances for the Sydney Roosters in the 2019 NRL season as the club reached the 2019 NRL Grand Final against Canberra.  The club would go on to win 14-8 with Liu starting at prop.  It was the club's second consecutive premiership victory and Liu's second as a player.

Liu played 19 games for the Sydney Roosters in the 2020 NRL season.  The club reached the finals but were eliminated by Canberra at the Sydney Cricket Ground.
On 7 July 2021, Liu signed a contract to join the Gold Coast for the start of the 2022 season.  Liu played 26 games for the Sydney Roosters in the 2021 NRL season as the club reached the finals but were eliminated in the second week by Manly.
Liu played a total of 23 games for the Gold Coast in the 2022 NRL season as the club finished 13th on the table.

References

External links
Sydney Roosters profile
Roosters profile
Newtown Jets profile
2017 RLWC profile

1991 births
New Zealand rugby league players
New Zealand people of Niuean descent
New Zealand sportspeople of Samoan descent
Rugby league players from Auckland
Samoa national rugby league team players
Sydney Roosters players
Gold Coast Titans players
Newtown Jets NSW Cup players
Otahuhu Leopards players
Rugby league locks
Rugby league props
Rugby league second-rows
People educated at Keebra Park State High School
Living people
New Zealand national rugby league team players